The following is the 2002–03 network television schedule for the six major English language commercial broadcast networks in the United States. The schedule covers primetime hours from September 2002 through August 2003. The schedule is followed by a list per network of returning series, new series, and series cancelled after the 2001–02 season. All times are Eastern and Pacific, with certain exceptions, such as Monday Night Football.

New series are highlighted in bold.

Each of the 30 highest-rated shows is listed with its rank and rating as determined by Nielsen Media Research.

 Yellow indicates the programs in the top 10 for the season.
 Cyan indicates the programs in the top 20 for the season.
 Magenta indicates the programs in the top 30 for the season.
Other Legend
 Light blue indicates local programming.
 Gray indicates encore programming.
 Blue-gray indicates news programming.
 Light green indicates sporting events.
 Light Purple indicates movies. 
 Red indicates series being burned off and other scheduled programs, including specials.

PBS is not included; member stations have local flexibility over most of their schedules and broadcast times for network shows may vary.

Sunday

NOTE: Fox was to have aired Oliver Beene and The Grubbs on Sundays at 7:30 p.m. and 9:30 p.m., respectively, but instead made last-minute changes by postponing Oliver Beene to the following spring and canceling The Grubbs. In their places, reruns of King of the Hill and Malcolm in the Middle were slotted.

Monday
{| class="wikitable" style="width:100%;margin-right:0;text-align:center"
|-
! colspan="2" style="background-color:#C0C0C0;text-align:center"| Network
! style="background-color:#C0C0C0;text-align:center"| 8:00 PM
! style="background-color:#C0C0C0;text-align:center"| 8:30 PM
! style="background-color:#C0C0C0;text-align:center"| 9:00 PM
! style="background-color:#C0C0C0;text-align:center"| 9:30 PM
! style="background-color:#C0C0C0;text-align:center"| 10:00 PM
! style="background-color:#C0C0C0;text-align:center"| 10:30 PM
|-
!rowspan="9"|ABC
!Fall
|The Drew Carey Show
|Whose Line Is It Anyway?
|rowspan="3" bgcolor="lightgreen"| NFL Monday Showcase|bgcolor="#FFFF00" rowspan="3" colspan="3"|Monday Night Football (#10/11.4)
|-
!Follow Up
| bgcolor="#FF8888" colspan="2" | Various Specials|-
!December
|colspan="2" bgcolor="#C0C0C0"| Monk 
|-
! January
| bgcolor="#CF9FFF" colspan="6" | ABC Monday Night Movie|-
! Follow Up
|colspan="2"|Veritas: The Quest|rowspan="3" colspan="2"|The Practice|rowspan="2" colspan="2"|Miracles|-
!Spring
| colspan="2" rowspan="2" bgcolor="#77AACC"|ABC News Specials|-
! Follow Up
|colspan="2"|The Practice|-
! Summer
| bgcolor="#C0C0C0" colspan="4" | 4 Back-to-Back Encore Episodes of Various ABC Comedies|colspan="2" bgcolor="#77AACC" |Primetime Live: Special Edition|-
! August
|colspan="6" bgcolor="lightgreen"| NFL Preseason Football|-
!rowspan="2"|CBS
! Fall
|bgcolor="#FF66FF"|The King of Queens (#25/8.5)
|bgcolor="#FF66FF"|Yes, Dear (#24/8.6)
|bgcolor="#FFFF00" rowspan="2" |Everybody Loves Raymond (#7/11.9)(Tied with Survivor)
|bgcolor="#00FFFF"|Still Standing (#19/9.4)(Tied with Law & Order: Criminal Intent)
|bgcolor="#00FFFF" colspan="2" rowspan="2" |CSI: Miami (#11/11.0)(Tied with Will & Grace)
|-
! Mid-Summer
|bgcolor="#FF66FF"|Yes, Dear (#24/8.6)
|bgcolor="#00FFFF"|Still Standing (#19/9.4)(Tied with Law & Order: Criminal Intent)
|bgcolor="#FF66FF"|The King of Queens (#25/8.5)
|-
!rowspan="8"|Fox
!Fall
| bgcolor="lightgreen" colspan="6"| MLB on FOX|-
! Mid-October
|colspan="2" rowspan="5"|Boston Public|colspan="2"|Girls Club|bgcolor="#abbfff" colspan="2" rowspan="7"|Local Programming
|-
!Follow Up
| bgcolor="#FF8888" colspan="2" | Various Specials|-
!Winter
|bgcolor="#FFFF00" colspan="2"|Joe Millionaire (#3/13.3)
|-
!Spring
|colspan="2"|Married by America|-
!Follow Up 
|colspan="2"|Mr. Personality|-
!June
|Anything for Love|Stupid Behavior Caught on Tape|colspan="2" rowspan="2" |Paradise Hotel|-
! August
| colspan="2" bgcolor="#C0C0C0" | The O.C. (Repeats)
|-
!rowspan="3"|NBC
!Fall
|bgcolor="#FF66FF" rowspan="3" colspan="2"|Fear Factor (#30/7.7)
|colspan="2"|Third Watch|colspan="2"|Crossing Jordan|-
!Summer
|rowspan="2" colspan="2"|For Love or Money|colspan="2"|Meet My Folks|-
!Follow Up
|colspan="2"|Who Wants to Marry My Dad?|-
!colspan="2"|UPN
|The Parkers|One on One|Girlfriends|Half & Half|bgcolor="#abbfff" rowspan="3" colspan="2"|Local Programming
|-
!rowspan="2"|The WB
! Fall
|colspan="2" rowspan="2"|7th Heaven|colspan="2"|Everwood|-
! Mid-Summer
|colspan="2"|7th Heaven|}

Tuesday

NOTE: Grounded for Life was also originally scheduled to run on Tuesdays at 8:30 p.m. on Fox, but it was pulled after two new episodes in September, and one in early December. The show moved to The WB in the spring in 2003.

Wednesday

Thursday

NOTE: Movies, baseball games, reruns, and specials comprised most of the programming Thursday nights on FOX. Septuplets was supposed to air at 9-10, but it was cancelled at the last minute.

Friday

Saturday

By network
ABC

Returning series20/20ABC Saturday Movie of the WeekAccording to JimAliasAmerica's Funniest Home VideosThe BachelorThe Drew Carey ShowGeorge LopezThe MoleMonday Night FootballMonkMy Wife and KidsNYPD BlueThe PracticePrimetimeWhose Line is it Anyway?The Wonderful World of DisneyNew series8 Simple Rules for Dating My Teenage DaughterAre You Hot?: The Search for America's Sexiest People *The BacheloretteThe Dating Experiment *DinotopiaExtreme Makeover *The Family *I'm a Celebrity...Get Me Out of Here *L.A. Dragnet *Less than PerfectLife with BonnieLost at Home *MDsMiraclesProfiles from the Front Line *Push, NevadaThe Real Roseanne Show *Regular Joe *That Was ThenVeritas: The Quest *

Not returning from 2001–02:Bob PattersonThe ChairThe CourtDharma & GregHouston MedicalThe JobOnce and AgainPhillySpin CityThievesVanishedThe Wayne Brady ShowWednesday 9:30 (8:30 Central)Who Wants to Be a MillionaireWidowsCBS

Returning series48 Hours60 Minutes60 Minutes IIThe AgencyThe Amazing RaceBaby BobBeckerBig BrotherCBS Sunday MovieCSI: Crime Scene InvestigationThe DistrictEverybody Loves RaymondThe GuardianJAGJudging AmyThe King of QueensSurvivorTouched by an AngelYes, DearNew seriesBram & AliceCharlie Lawrence *CSI: MiamiHackMy Big Fat Greek Life *Presidio MedQueens Supreme *Robbery Homicide DivisionStar Search *Still StandingWithout a TraceNot returning from 2001–02:Citizen BainesDannyThe Education of Max BickfordThe Ellen ShowFamily LawFirst MondayThat's LifeWolf LakeFox

Returning series2430 Seconds to FameAmerican IdolAmerica's Most WantedAndy Richter Controls the UniverseThe Bernie Mac ShowBoston PublicCopsFuturamaKing of the HillMalcolm in the MiddleThe SimpsonsTemptation IslandThat '70s ShowTotally Outrageous BehaviorNew seriesAmerican Juniors *Anything for Love *Banzai! *Cedric the Entertainer PresentsFastlaneFireflyGirls ClubJoe Millionaire *John DoeKeen Eddie *Married by America *Mr. Personality *Oliver Beene *Paradise Hotel *Performing As... *The Pitts *Stupid Behavior Caught on Tape *Wanda at Large *
 

Not returning from 2001–02:Ally McBealThe American EmbassyBeyond Belief: Fact or FictionThe ChamberDark AngelFamily Guy (returned for 2004-05)Greg the BunnyGrounded for Life (moved to The WB)Guinness World Records PrimetimeLove CruisePasadenaThat '80s ShowThe TickTitusUndeclaredWorld's Wildest Police VideosThe X-Files (returned for 2015-16)

NBC

Returning seriesCrossing JordanDateline NBCDog Eat DogEdERFear FactorFrasierFriendsJust Shoot Me!Law & OrderLaw & Order: Criminal IntentLaw & Order: Special Victims UnitMeet My FolksProvidenceScrubsThird WatchWatching EllieThe West WingWill & GraceNew seriesAmerica's Most Talented Kid *American DreamsA.U.S.A. *BoomtownFame *Good Morning, MiamiFor Love or Money *Hidden HillsIn-LawsKingpin *Last Comic Standing *Mister Sterling *Race to the Altar *The Restaurant *Who Wants to Marry My Dad? *

Not returning from 2001–02:EmerilImagine ThatInside SchwartzLeap of FaithLostThe Rerun ShowSpy TVThree SistersUC: UndercoverThe Weakest Link (returned for 2020-21)

UPN

Returning seriesBuffy the Vampire SlayerGirlfriendsOne on OneThe ParkersStar Trek: EnterpriseUPN's Night at the MoviesWWE SmackDown!New seriesAbby *America's Next Top Model *Half & HalfHauntedPlatinum *The Twilight ZoneNot returning from 2001–02:As IfThe HughleysThe Random YearsRoswellUnder One RoofThe WB

Returning series7th HeavenAngelCharmedDawson’s CreekFlix From the FrogGilmore GirlsGrounded for Life (moved from FOX)The Jamie Kennedy ExperimentOff CentreRebaSabrina the Teenage WitchSmallvilleNew seriesBirds of PreyBlack Sash *Boarding House: North Shore *Do OverEverwoodFamily AffairGreetings from TucsonHigh School Reunion *The O'Keefes *On the Spot *Pepsi Smash *The Surreal Life *What I Like About YouNot returning from 2001–02:Elimidate DeluxeFelicityFor Your LoveGlory DaysMaybe It's MeMen, Women & DogsMy Guide to Becoming a Rock StarNikkiPopstars USARaising DadRipley's Believe It or Not!The Steve Harvey Show''

Note: The * indicates that the program was introduced in midseason.

References

United States primetime network television schedules
United States Network Television Schedule, 2002-03
United States Network Television Schedule, 2002-03